Contrazy is a commune in the Ariège department in southwestern France.

Population

Its inhabitants are called Contrasiens.

See also
Communes of the Ariège department

References

Communes of Ariège (department)
Ariège communes articles needing translation from French Wikipedia